Paradise Valley is a town in Maricopa County, Arizona, United States, and a suburb of Phoenix, the state's largest city. It is Arizona's wealthiest municipality. The town is known for its luxury golf courses, shopping, expensive real estate, and restaurant scene. According to the 2020 census, its population was 12,658. Despite its relatively small area and population compared to other municipalities in the Phoenix metropolitan area, Paradise Valley is home to eight full-service resorts, making it one of Arizona's premier tourist destinations. 

The town's name comes from the expansive area known as Paradise Valley that spreads from north of the Phoenix Mountains to Cave Creek and Carefree on the north and the McDowell Mountains to the east. Resident children attend schools in the Scottsdale Unified School District.

History

The town's history dates to a more agrarian society. After the initial European settlement, Paradise Valley was first used for cattle grazing. In the 1880s, when the land was being surveyed so it could be developed into agricultural lots, the name "Paradise Valley" first came into use, given by surveyors from the Rio Verde Canal Company and its manager at the time, Frank Conkey. The name may have been chosen due to the abundance of spring wildflowers and palo verde trees. Mainly an agricultural area during the 1800s and the first half of the 1900s, the area began to be settled after World War II, on large,  lots for which it became known.

As the neighboring settlements of Phoenix and Scottsdale began to grow and annex adjoining areas, the residents of what became Paradise Valley were concerned that the qualities they most valued would be lost if they were consumed by their larger neighbors. These residents formed the "Citizens Committee for the Incorporation of The Town of Paradise Valley, Arizona", which collected enough signatures to take to the Maricopa County Board of Supervisors. The supervisors granted the petition, allowing the town of Paradise Valley to be incorporated on May 24, 1961.

Today, Paradise Valley is Phoenix's wealthiest suburb, known primarily for its many resorts and expensive real estate.

Geography

The central terrain of Paradise Valley is dominated by Mummy Mountain. Other landmarks include Camelback Mountain on the southern border and the Piestewa Peak mountainous area on the western border.

Several historical sites are within the town, including the Harold C. Price, Sr. House,  McCune Mansion/Hormel Mansion, and Barry Goldwater Memorial Park.

Demographics

Paradise Valley's motto, coined by residents, is "There is a reason we call this valley 'paradise'."

As of the census of 2000, 13,664 people, 5,034 households, and 4,163 families resided in the town. The 5,499 housing units averaged 354.8 per square mile (137.0/km2). The racial makeup of the town was 95.6% White, 0.7% Black or African American, 0.2% Native American, 2.0% Asian, <0.1% Pacific Islander, 0.4% from other races, and 1.0% from two or more races. About 2.7% of the population was Hispanic or Latino of any race.

Of the 5,034 households, 33.3% had children under the age of 18 living with them, 76.1% were married couples living together, 4.3% had a female householder with no husband present, and 17.3% were not families; 13.6% of all households were made up of individuals, and 6.9% had someone living alone who was 65 years of age or older. The average household size was 2.71 and the average family size was 2.98.

In the town, the population was distributed as 24.9% under the age of 18, 4.0% from 18 to 24, 18.8% from 25 to 44, 35.9% from 45 to 64, and 16.4% who were 65 years of age or older. The median age was 46 years. For every 100 females, there were 98.7 males. For every 100 females age 18 and over, there were 96.1 males.

The median income for a household in the town was $150,228, and for a family was $164,811. Males had a median income of $100,000 versus $52,302 for females. The per capita income for the town was $81,290. About 1.9% of families and 2.5% of the population were below the poverty line, including 1.5% of those under age 18 and 2.8% of those age 65 or over. In 2012, the Forbes magazine named Paradise Valley's zip code, 85253, the 71st-most expensive in the United States. This ranking also makes it the most expensive in the state of Arizona.

Government
Mayor Jerry Bien-Willner, first elected in 2018, began his third term as mayor in 2022. The mayor and six town council members are the elected representatives of the Town of Paradise Valley. The council has six members, who are elected to serve four-year staggered terms. In 2010, voters approved direct election of the mayor. Scott LeMarr became the first directly elected mayor in 2012. The council still selects its vice mayor from among its members. 

The Town's accredited police department is led by Chief Freeman Carney.

In 2012, citizens gathered 500 signatures on a petition requesting that the council reconsider the issue of direct election of the mayor. In June 2012, the council voted to return the question of direct election of mayor to the people. Residents voted to keep direct election of the mayor.

Paradise Valley is in Congressional District 6, which has been represented by David Schweikert since its creation in 2011. Despite the town's conservative lean, at the state level it has been represented by three Democrats since 2020. A part of Legislative District 28, it is represented by Christine Marsh in the State Senate and by Kelli Butler and Aaron Lieberman in the House of Representatives.

Education
Most of Paradise Valley is within the Scottsdale Unified School District. A relatively small portion, however, is served by Creighton Elementary School District and  Phoenix Union High School District.

Several charter schools also are in the area, including nearby Great Hearts Academies and BASIS Schools, as well as private schools such as Phoenix Country Day School.

Economy

Top employers
According to Paradise Valley's 2014 Comprehensive Annual Financial Report, the top employers in the town are:

Confusion with other Paradise Valley designations
The town is not to be confused with Paradise Valley Village, an official municipal designation, in northeast Phoenix. For instance, Paradise Valley Community College, Paradise Valley High School, Paradise Valley Mall, Paradise Valley Golf Course, and the former Paradise Valley Hospital are all several miles north of the town, in Phoenix. The Paradise Valley Unified School District does not serve the town; its boundaries end a few miles north of the border.

Notable people

 Michael Bidwill, businessman, prosecutor, and football executive; he is the principal owner, chairman, and president of the Arizona Cardinals
 Doug Ducey, politician and businessman, governor of Arizona
 Barry Goldwater, U.S. senator and 1964 Republican presidential nominee
 Jay Grdina, businessman and former pornographic actor
 Bil Keane, cartoonist, creator of The Family Circus
 Kliff Kingsbury, Arizona Cardinals head coach
 Brooks Lennon, professional soccer player for Atlanta United
 G. Gordon Liddy, Watergate scandal figure and Nixon appointee
 Sandra Day O'Connor, former Justice of the US Supreme Court
 Michael Phelps, former competitive swimmer and the most successful and most decorated Olympian of all time, with a total of 28 medals
 Dan Quayle, Vice President of the United States (1989–1993), U.S. senator from Indiana (1981–1989), and representative of Indiana's 4th congressional district (1977–1981)
 William Rehnquist, former Chief Justice of the US Supreme Court

See also

 List of historic properties in Paradise Valley, Arizona
 Saint Barnabas on the Desert

References

External links
 
 

 
Phoenix metropolitan area
Towns in Maricopa County, Arizona
Populated places established in 1961
Populated places in the Sonoran Desert